Tawanda Sean Muyeye (born 5 March 2001) is a Zimbabwean-born professional cricketer who plays for Kent County Cricket Club in England. He is a right-handed batsman and right-arm off break bowler.

Early life
Muyeye was born in Zimbabwe and grew up close to Harare. He was educated at Peterhouse Boys' School in Mashonaland East Province and captained the Zimbabwe national side at under-13 and under-16 level, as well as playing rugby union for the national under-14 side, before earning a scholarship to Eastbourne College in England. Muyeye was named as a reserve in the Zimbabwean squad for the 2018 Under-19 Cricket World Cup at the age of 15.

An asylum seeker who came to the UK with his mother, a supporter of the opposition Movement for Democratic Change, Muyeye was granted indefinite leave to remain and settled in the UK. He has expressed an ambition to play international cricket for England.

At Eastbourne he was coached by former professionals Rob Ferley, James Tredwell and Andy Hodd and scored 1,112 runs and hit 56 sixes in his first season, both records for the school. His batting performances for Eastbourne, including two double hundreds, led him to being named the 2019 Young Wisden Schools Cricketer of the Year.

Professional cricket career
While at Eastbourne, Muyeye played for Sussex's under-17 and second XI sides, but signed his first professional contract with Kent in March 2021, qualifying as a domestic player after his time at Eastbourne. He made his first-class cricket debut for Kent on 13 May 2021, in the 2021 County Championship against Sussex at Hove and his List A debut later the same season in the 2021 Royal London One-Day Cup. He made his Twenty20 debut on 7 June 2022 in the 2022 T20 Blast. In January 2023 Muyeye signed a new three-year contract with Kent.

References

External links

2001 births
Living people
Refugees in the United Kingdom
Zimbabwean cricketers
Kent cricketers
Sportspeople from Harare